Castle Point Anime Convention (abbreviated as CPAC) is an annual two-day anime convention held during April/May at the Meadowlands Exposition Center in Secaucus, New Jersey. The convention is organized by the Stevens Institute of Technology's Stevens Anime Club, and was located on campus for several years.

Programming 
The convention typically offers an Artist's Alley, card games, dance, dealers' room, masquerade, musical performances, panels, video games, and workshops.

History 
CPAC 2020 was canceled due to the COVID-19 pandemic. The convention held a virtual event for 2021.

Event history

References

Further reading 
CPAC shatters attendance record The Stute, Retrieved 2020-06-02
Photos: Castle Point Anime Convention 2017 AXS, Retrieved 2020-06-02

External links 
 

Anime conventions in the United States
Annual events in New Jersey
New Jersey culture
2008 establishments in New Jersey
Festivals in New Jersey
Recurring events established in 2008
Conventions in New Jersey
Secaucus, New Jersey
Hoboken, New Jersey